Kim Ju Sik (born September 25, 1992) is a North Korean pair skater. With his skating partner, Ryom Tae-ok, he is the 2018 Four Continents bronze medalist, the 2017 Asian Winter Games bronze medalist, 2016 Cup of Tyrol bronze medalist, and 2016 Asian Open Trophy champion. 

Ryom and Kim were the first North Korean figure skaters to win a medal at an ISU event.

Kim Hyon Son coaches the pair in Pyongyang.

Programs

With Ryom

With Kang

Competitive highlights 
GP: Grand Prix; CS: Challenger Series; JGP: Junior Grand Prix

Pairs with Ryom

Pairs with Kang

Men's singles

Detailed results

With Ryom Tae-ok 

Small medals for short and free programs awarded only at ISU Championships.

ISU Personal bests highlighted in bold.

References

External links 
 
 Confession of Gold Medallists at The Pyongyang Times

1992 births
Figure skaters at the 2017 Asian Winter Games
Medalists at the 2017 Asian Winter Games
Asian Games bronze medalists for North Korea
North Korean male pair skaters
Living people
Sportspeople from Pyongyang
Figure skaters at the 2018 Winter Olympics
Olympic figure skaters of North Korea
Asian Games medalists in figure skating
Four Continents Figure Skating Championships medalists